ACW may refer to:
 American Civil War
 Air Control Wing, e.g.:
116th Air Control Wing
461st Air Control Wing
552d Air Control Wing
 Anticlockwise
 Acorn Cambridge Workstation, a microcomputer
 Arts Council of Wales
 Hejazi Arabic, a language dialect
Anglican Church Women
Ancient Christian Writers, a book series